ATFS may refer to:

 Artificial transcription factor, an example of a chimeral protein designed to target and modulate gene transcription.
 Association of Track and Field Statisticians, an international organisation run by volunteers whose goal is to collect and disseminate the statistics of Track and Field Athletics.
After The Forking Show, the explicit podcast created by the team from Spoonman's Classic Rock Show.
American Tree Farm System, a certification program for tree farms